Kevin Greene or Green may refer to:

Sports people
Kevin Green (Australian footballer) (born 1935)
Kevin Greene (rugby union) (born 1949), New Zealand rugby union player
Kevin Greene (American football) (1962–2020), American football player and coach

Other people
Kevin Greene (politician) (born 1958), Australian politician
Kevin Green (investor) (born 1968), Welsh businessman
Kevin Green (politician) (born 1970), American politician
Kevin Greene (archaeologist), British archaeologist
Kevin J. Greene, American law professor